</noinclude>

 was an ancient province or region of Japan in what is now the Hokuriku region.

Koshi appears as one of the original provinces in the Nihon Shoki. In 598 AD, the residents of Koshi presented a white deer to Empress Suiko as tribute.

At the end of the 7th century, Koshi was divided into three separate provinces: Echizen, Etchū, and Echigo (as noted in the Taihō Code). The names of these provinces mean 'Upper-Koshi' (Echizen), 'Middle-Koshi' (Etchu), and 'Lower-Koshi' (Echigo), respectively, indicating their relative positions with respect to the capital region (Kinki) at the time the Ritsuryō system was enacted. Later, parts of Echizen were separated off into Noto and Kaga provinces.

See also
Koshibito
 Hokurikudō
 Hokuriku subregion

Notes

References
 Asiatic Society of Japan. (1874). Transactions of the Asiatic Society of Japan. Yokohama: The Society. OCLC 1514456 
 Nussbaum, Louis-Frédéric and Käthe Roth. (2005).  Japan encyclopedia. Cambridge: Harvard University Press. ;  OCLC 58053128

Former countries in Japanese history
Hokuriku region